Nerilka's Story & The Coelura is a collection by Anne McCaffrey published in 1987.

Plot summary
Nerilka's Story & The Coelura is composed of two mini-novels, Nerilka and The Coelura.

Reception
Dave Langford reviewed Nerilka's Story & The Coelura for White Dwarf #90, and stated that "There's the seed of something interesting here, but the short format allows only a standard candyfloss ending [...] and a nice double wedding to finish. Hear those violins?"

Reviews
Review by Tom Easton (1986) in Analog Science Fiction/Science Fact, December 1986
Review by Denise Gorse (1987) in Vector 137

References

1987 novels